The Mighty Treve is a 1937 American drama film directed by Lewis D. Collins and written by Albert R. Perkins, Marcus Goodrich and Charles Grayson. It is based on the 1925 novel Treve by Albert Payson Terhune. The film stars Noah Beery Jr., Barbara Read, Samuel S. Hinds, Hobart Cavanaugh, Alma Kruger and Earle Foxe. The film was released on January 17, 1937, by Universal Pictures.

Plot
Sheepdog Treve and his owner are given a job in a sheep-ranch owned by an eccentric with a huge fear of dogs, owners of surrounding ranches accuse Treve of being a sheep killer.

Cast       
Noah Beery Jr. as Bud McClelland
Barbara Read as Aileen Fenno
Samuel S. Hinds as Uncle Joel Fenno
Hobart Cavanaugh as Mr. Davis
Alma Kruger as Mrs. Davis
Earle Foxe as Judson 
Julian Rivero as Pepe
Edmund Cobb as Slego
Spencer Charters as Watling
Frank Reicher as Eben McClelland
Erville Alderson as Chris Hibbens
Guy Usher as Edward L. Wilton
Tuffy as Treve
Chester Gan as Chang
Robert McKenzie as Sheriff
Monte Vandergrift as Policeman
Harold Erickson as Deputy Lafe
William Gould as First Dog Show Judge 
Guy Edward Hearn as Second Dog Show Judge
Ralph Gilliam as Rancher's Boy
Robert Dudley as Rancher at Auction
Heinie Conklin as Rancher at Auction
Al Williams as Program Seller
Georgie Billings as Rancher's Son
Nora Cecil as Old Maid at Dog Show

References

External links
 

1937 films
1930s English-language films
American drama films
1937 drama films
Universal Pictures films
Films directed by Lewis D. Collins
American black-and-white films
1930s American films